The mixed doubles tournament at the 1991 French Open was held from 27 May until 9 June 1991 on the outdoor clay courts at the Stade Roland Garros in Paris, France. Helena Suková and Cyril Suk won the title, defeating Caroline Vis and Paul Haarhuis in the final.

Draw

Finals

Top half

Section 1

Section 2

Bottom half

Section 3

Section 4

External links
1991 French Open – Doubles draws and results at the International Tennis Federation

Mixed Doubles
French Open by year – Mixed doubles